The Gun in Betty Lou's Handbag is a 1992 American screwball comedy film directed by Allan Moyle and produced by Scott Kroopf. It stars Penelope Ann Miller, Eric Thal, William Forsythe, Cathy Moriarty and Alfre Woodard. Rock and roll recording pioneer Cordell Jackson played a bit part as "Bathroom Woman".

The film was distributed by Touchstone Pictures for Interscope Communications.

Plot
Betty Lou Perkins is a meek librarian in New Orleans who nobody pays much attention to, in particular her husband, Alex. A criminal kingpin is killed in cold blood, and Betty Lou happens to find the murder gun. She is so mousy, however, that she cannot even get the police to listen to her, including Alex, who is a detective. In sheer frustration, she not only produces the gun, but also announces that she is the one who committed the crime.

Behind bars, Betty Lou meets a variety of hardened and colorful characters. Rather than intimidate her, they actually increase her self-confidence. Once she is released, she begins to dress, speak, and act differently. Unfortunately for her, criminal acquaintances of the victim assume she must have confessed to the murder for a reason. They conclude she must be his mistress, and soon, the bad guys want a few words with her ... or worse.

Cast
 Penelope Ann Miller as Betty Lou Perkins
 Eric Thal as Alex Perkins
 Julianne Moore as Elinor
 William Forsythe as Billy Beaudeen
 Alfre Woodard as Ann Orkin
 Cathy Moriarty as Reba Bush
 Xander Berkeley as Mr. Marchat
 Ray McKinnon as Frank Finch
 Andy Romano as Shelby Herrick
 Faye Grant as Charleen Barnes
 Michael O'Neill as Jergens
 Christopher John Fields as Brown
 Billie Neal as Gail
 Marian Seldes as Margaret Armstrong
 Meat Loaf as Lawrence
 Catherine Keener as Suzanne
 Stanley Tucci as Amos Lansing (uncredited)

Production

Reception
The Gun in Betty Lou's Handbag was panned by critics. It holds a 14% rating on Rotten Tomatoes, based on 23 reviews.

Entertainment Weekly, reviewing the film when it was released in home video, gave the film a D+, and called it a "foolish farce". The British film magazine Empire gave it three stars out of five, calling it "watchable" and noting that "Miller is a winning heroine", but characterizing the film as "too busy to be really funny". The Austin Chronicle gave it two stars: "The cast shines in The Gun in Betty Lou's Handbag; watching these performers, you know this movie would have made for an inspired farce, given better writing and direction."

Home media
The film was released on DVD by Touchstone Home Entertainment on September 2, 2003, and on Blu-ray by Mill Creek Entertainment in May 2011.

References

External links
 
 
 

1992 films
1992 comedy films
1990s screwball comedy films
American screwball comedy films
Films directed by Allan Moyle
Films scored by Richard Gibbs
Films set in New Orleans
Films shot in New Orleans
Films about librarians
Interscope Communications films
Touchstone Pictures films
Films produced by Scott Kroopf
1990s English-language films
1990s American films